BARCAP/BarCap may refer to:

 "Barrier Combat Air Patrol" (BARCAP), a type of combat air patrol
 Barclays Capital (BarCap), the former name of the investment banking division of Barclays